Whitnall may refer to:

Places
 Whitnall High School  comprehensive secondary school in Milwaukee, Wisconsin, US
 Whitnall School District, a school district in Wisconsin, US

People with the surname
 Charles B. Whitnall ((born 1859), first Socialist, treasurer of Milwaukee, Wisconsin, US
 Graeme Whitnall (1952–2021), Australian rules footballer
 Lance Whitnall (born 1979), Australian rules footballer, son of Graeme Whitnall
 Mick Whitnall (born 1968), English guitarist for the band Babyshambles
 Tim Whitnall (born 1961), English actor